Sphingobacterium jejuense is a Gram-negative, strictly aerobic and non-motile bacterium from the genus of Sphingobacterium which has been isolated from isolated from compost.

References

External links
Type strain of Sphingobacterium jejuense at BacDive -  the Bacterial Diversity Metadatabase

 

Sphingobacteriia
Bacteria described in 2016